Walkerana diplosticta, also known as the spotted leaping frog, Malabar Indian frog, rufous leaf-hopper frog, and Günther's frog, is a species of frog in the family Ranixalidae. It is endemic to the Western Ghats south of the Palghat Gap and only known with certainty from the states of Kerala and Tamil Nadu, India. Localities with confirmed records include the Kalakkad Mundanthurai Tiger Reserve.

Description
The canthus rostralis is distinct. The tympanum is distinct and relatively large. The finger and toe tips bear discs. The toes are partially webbed. The dorsum is grey-pink or reddish-brown. The snout is paler and bordered by dark bar between the eyes. A brown stripe runs from the snout to the shoulder. The groin has brown spots. The ventrum is light brown with darker spots. The limbs are cross-barred. Dorsal skin is smooth.

Habitat and conservation
Walkerana diplosticta was assessed by the International Union for Conservation of Nature in 2004 and includes records that are now considered requiring confirmation. At the time, it was considered to be an uncommon species and believed to be declining. It is a terrestrial frogs found near hill streams in primary wet evergreen and semi-evergreen tropical forests and swamps; is not present in secondary forest or modified habitats. It breeds on wet rocks, and the tadpoles are found on wet rock surfaces next to streams.

References

diplosticta
Frogs of India
Endemic fauna of the Western Ghats
Amphibians described in 1876
Taxa named by Albert Günther
Taxobox binomials not recognized by IUCN